The 1966 Virginia Cavaliers football team represented the University of Virginia during the 1966 NCAA University Division football season. The Cavaliers were led by second-year head coach George Blackburn and played their home games at Scott Stadium in Charlottesville, Virginia. They competed as members of the Atlantic Coast Conference, finishing tied for third.

Schedule

References

Virginia
Virginia Cavaliers football seasons
Virginia Cavaliers football